Diana Saravia Olmos is a Uruguayan notary and political figure.

Background and previous political alliances

While the National Party's Aparicio Saravia was a collateral family forebear, she is a former Deputy, and former supporter of 'Pachequismo' and subsequently the Ballistas within the Colorado Party (Uruguay). She was formerly seen as politically close to Jorge Pacheco Klein, who, however, left the country in 1998.

Current political alignment with Pedro Bordaberry Herrán

In 2008 Saravia adhered to Pedro Bordaberry Herrán's 'Vamos Uruguay' grouping within the Colorado Party. Partly given her family background and her past association with 'Pachequismo', she is thus thought to add to the potential of 'Vamos Uruguay' to attract support beyond the Colorado Party's traditional electoral backers.

References

See also
 Politics of Uruguay
 Colorado Party (Uruguay)#Post 2004: defeat at polls and rise of Pedro Bordaberry
 Pedro Bordaberry#Bordaberry and Riversita resurgence

Year of birth missing (living people)
Living people
Uruguayan people of Portuguese descent
Uruguayan notaries
Members of the Chamber of Representatives of Uruguay
Uruguayan women jurists
Colorado Party (Uruguay) politicians
21st-century Uruguayan women politicians
21st-century Uruguayan politicians
20th-century Uruguayan women politicians
20th-century Uruguayan politicians